Simeon "Simi" Hamilton (born May 14, 1987) is an American, former cross-country skier, who competed between 2000 and 2021.. Hamilton attended Middlebury College from 2005 to 2009, during which time he competed for its ski team, individually earning several All-American NCAA Championship results. It was announced on 29 January 2010 that Hamilton qualified for the 2010 Winter Olympics. Hamilton competed in the 15 kilometer freestyle, 1.5 kilometer classic sprint, and 4x10km relay races. He paced all Americans in the field in the 1.5 kilometer sprint by advancing to the medal rounds and finishing 29th of 96 competitors. In the relay, Hamilton pulled away from the Estonian skier in the anchor leg to secure a 13th-place finish.

On December 31, 2013, Hamilton won Stage 3 of the 2013–14 FIS Tour de Ski, a 1.5 kilometer freestyle sprint. In doing so, he became the first American male skier to win a World Cup race since Bill Koch won the Sarajevo 30 km in February 1983. On December 19, 2015, Hamilton placed second in the World Cup freestyle sprint in Toblach.

He announced his retirement from cross-country skiing in March, 2021.

Since 2019, Hamilton is married to fellow U.S. cross-country teammate Sophie Caldwell.

Cross-country skiing results
All results are sourced from the International Ski Federation (FIS).

Olympic Games

World Championships

World Cup

Season standings

Individual podiums
 1 victory – (1 ) 
 4 podiums – (2 , 2 )

References

External links

1987 births
American male cross-country skiers
Cross-country skiers at the 2010 Winter Olympics
Cross-country skiers at the 2014 Winter Olympics
Cross-country skiers at the 2018 Winter Olympics
Tour de Ski skiers
Living people
Middlebury College alumni
Olympic cross-country skiers of the United States